

Results

Final standings

France win the tournament with two victories.

European Nations Cup
European rugby league championship
International rugby league competitions hosted by the United Kingdom
International rugby league competitions hosted by France
1977 in French rugby league
1977 in English rugby league